This article lists some of the events that took place in the Netherlands in 2009.

Incumbents
Monarch: Beatrix
Prime Minister: Jan Peter Balkenende

Events

January

February
 10: The Postbank completely mergers into the ING Bank.

March
  29: KLM stops flying to Aruba. Subsidiary Martinair takes over the 4 flights a week.

April
 30: 2009 attack on the Dutch Royal Family

May
 1: Adolescence, a work of Salvador Dalí is stolen from the Scheringa Museum of Realist Art.

June
 4: 2009 European Parliament election in the Netherlands

July
 1: The air-tax that was introduced on 1 July 2008  is abolished.
 30: 6 Dutch people die in a bus accident at Sant Pol de Mar, Spain. Dozens of other people are hurt.

August
 19: A family tragedy takes place in Kampen, Overijssel. During a fire in a house 4 young children die. The remaining family members, amongst them 10 other children, find a way out of the house in time.

September
 6: Dutch soldier Kevin van der Rijdt, corporal van het Corps Commando-troops, dies near Deh Rahwod. He's the 20th soldier to die since the beginning of the mission in Afghanistan.
 6:The HSL-Zuid is officially opened. 
 7: The 21st soldier since the beginning of the mission in Afghanistan: Mark Leijsen, Sergeant-Major of the Pantsergenie, dies in Uruzgan in an assault with an improvised explosive.

October
 19: The DSB Bank is declared bankrupt.

November

December
 13: The Thalys starts driving on the Highspeed-line Schiphol - Antwerp.
 25: Northwest Airlines Flight 253, a passengers-flight  Amsterdam to Detroit, is the target of a failed bombing attempt.

Sport
 March 5–23: The Netherlands participated at the 2009 World Baseball Classic. The Netherlands lost to Puerto Rico in the Seeding game.
 March 25–29 Netherlands at the 2009 UCI Track Cycling World Championships
 July 1–5 Netherlands at the 2009 European Road Championships
 The Netherlands won 2 gold, 2 silver and 2 bronze medals.
Ellen van Dijk won gold in the Women's time trial and Chantal Blaak in the Women's road race
 August 15–23 Netherlands at the 2009 World Championships in Athletics
 September 23–27 Netherlands at the 2009 UCI Road World Championships
 October 18: Gilbert Yegon wins the Amsterdam Marathon

See also
 2008–09 Eredivisie
 2008–09 Eerste Divisie
 2008–09 KNVB Cup
 2009 Johan Cruijff Schaal

See also
Netherlands in the Eurovision Song Contest 2009
Netherlands in the Junior Eurovision Song Contest 2009
List of Dutch Top 40 number-one singles of 2009
2009 in Dutch television

References

External links
Results by country (2009)

 
Netherlands
Years of the 21st century in the Netherlands
2000s in the Netherlands
Netherlands